Geophis laticollaris, also known as the widecollar  earth snake, is a snake of the colubrid family. It is found in Mexico.

References

Geophis
Snakes of North America
Reptiles of Mexico
Endemic fauna of Mexico
Taxa named by Hobart Muir Smith
Reptiles described in 1965